Sidonia von Borcke (1548–1620)  was a Pomeranian noblewoman who was tried and executed for witchcraft in the city of Stettin (today Szczecin, Poland). In posthumous legends, she is depicted as a femme fatale, and she has entered English literature as Sidonia the Sorceress. She had lived in various towns and villages throughout the country.

Alternative spellings
Her name may also be spelled as Sidonie von Bork, Borke, or Borken.

Life

Sidonia von Borcke was born in 1548 into a wealthy noble Pomeranian family. Her father, Otto von Borcke zu Stramehl-Regenwalde, died in 1551, and her mother, Anna von Schwiechelt, died in 1568.

After the death of her sister in 1600 she took residence in 1604 in the Lutheran Noble Damsels' Foundation in Marienfließ Abbey which, since 1569 and following the Protestant Reformation, was a convent for unmarried noblewomen.

Before that she had been involved in several lawsuits concerning support payments which, she claimed, were owed to her. Defendants in the suits were her brother, Ulrich, and Johann Friedrich, Duke of Pomerania (died 1600). One of these suits was even heard in the imperial court in Vienna.

While living in Marienfließ, Sidonia engaged in several private and judicial conflicts with her (mostly younger) co-residents and with the  administrative  staff of the abbey. When in 1606 she was dismissed from her post as an Unterpriorin (sub-prioress) by the convent's prioress, Magdalena von Petersdorff, she appealed her dismissal to Bogislaw XIII, Duke of Pomerania.

Bogislaw sent a Commission, headed by Joachim von Wedel, to investigate the dispute. The interaction between the Commission and Sidonia soon metamorphosed into a major feud. Von Wedel met in private with the Marienfließ Hauptmann (captain), Johannes von Hechthausen, to consider "getting rid of this poisonous snake." The feud ended with the death of Bogislaw XIII in 1606 and the deaths of von Petersdorff, von Wedel, and von Hechthausen (all in 1609).

Two years later, Sidonia filed complaints against the new prioress, Agnes von Kleist. These complaints were addressed to Philip II, Bogislaw's successor. Like his predecessor, Philip sent a Commission to investigate the complaints — a Commission headed by Jost von Borcke, a relative of Sidonia's who had already been humiliated when he was involved in prior lawsuits brought by Sidonia.

The new Commission did not succeed in calming the dispute, and Jost von Borcke described the situation at Marienfließ as one of chaos, mistrust, name-calling, and occasional violence. Philip II died in 1618 and was succeeded by Duke Francis I. Jost von Borcke was in good standing at Francis's court and remained head of the investigating Commission.

In July 1619, a dispute between Sidonia and Unterpriorin (sub-prioress) Dorothea von Stettin escalated out of control during a mass, and both women were arrested. Dorothea von Stettin then accused Sidonia of witchcraft, specifically of forcing a former Marienfließ factotum, Wolde Albrechts, to ask the devil about her (Sidonia's) future. 

Wolde Albrechts made her living from fortune-telling and begging after she lost her position at Marienfließ (this loss was a consequence of the death of Johannes von Hechthausen). She had travelled with gypsies in her youth, was known to have had several unstable sexual relationships, and was unmarried with an illegitimate child. 

Dorothea von Stettin persuaded Anna von Apenburg, her Marienfließ roommate, to support her accusation of Sidonia. According to contemporary law, the Constitutio Criminalis Carolina, two eyewitnesses were sufficient to convict both Sidonia and Wolde. Anna, however, withdrew her support of the accusation when she was asked to repeat her statement under oath.

Trials

The trials of Sidonia von Borcke and Wolde Albrechts were held  at the court in Stettin. These trials are well documented, with more than a thousand pages of the original trial record available in an archive in Greifswald (Rep 40 II Nr.37 Bd.I-III). The recent unexpected deaths of several Pomeranian dukes, along with widespread superstition, had created an atmosphere in which the public was prepared to blame the dukes' deaths on Sidonia's alleged witchcraft. This bias was strengthened when the Pomeranian dynasty became extinct in 1637.

Wolde Albrechts
The trial of Wolde Albrechts was a preface to the trial of Sidonia.

Albrechts was arrested on 28 July 1619. On 18 August, she was charged with maleficium and Teufelsbuhlschaft (i.e., sexual relations with the devil).

On 2 September, torture was admitted as a legitimate means of interrogation by the supreme court at Magdeburg.

On 7 September, Albrechts confessed under torture and accused Sidonia and two other women of witchcraft. She repeated these confessions in the presence of Sidonia during Sidonia's trial, which began on 1 October 1619. 

Albrechts was burned at the stake on 9 October 1619.

Sidonia von Borcke

Sidonia, who had been imprisoned in the Marienfließ Abbey, attempted to escape but failed. She also attempted suicide, but this also failed.

On 18 November 1619, she was transferred to a prison in Stettin.

In December, 72 charges were brought against her. The most important  of these were:

murder of her nephew, Otto von Borcke
murder of a priest, David Lüdecke
murder of duke Philip II of Pomerania-Stettin (died 1618)
murder of Magdalena von Petersdorff, prioress of Marienfließ
murder of Matthias Winterfeld, gatekeeper at Marienfließ
murder of Consistorial Counsellor Dr. Heinrich Schwalenberg
paralyzation of Katharina Hanow, a noblewoman at Marienfließ
consultation with soothsayers
knowledge of future and distant events
sexual contacts with the devil (who allegedly materialized in animals, such as Sidonia's cat, whose name was Chim)
magical practices, such as praying the "Judas psalm" (Psalm 109) and crossing brooms beneath a kitchen table

In January 1620, a man named Elias Pauli was appointed as Sidonia's defender. Although he presented a defense showing that those allegedly murdered had died natural deaths, he also dissociated himself from statements of Sidonia which had incriminated Jost von Borcke and other officials.

About fifty witnesses were questioned at the trial.
 
On 28 June, the Magdeburg court permitted the Stettin court to use torture. When torture was applied on 28 July, Sidonia confessed. The verdict of death was read to her when she was dragged to the execution site and her body was "ruptured" four times with pliers.

When Sidonia recanted her confession, she was tortured anew on 16 August.

On 1 September 1620, the final verdict was rendered. Sidonia was sentenced to death by beheading and subsequent burning of her body. The sentence was carried out in Stettin, outside the mill gate. The exact date of her death is not known.

In fiction
After Sidonia's death, her fate became legendary and was even more strongly associated with the extinction of the House of Pomerania.

Portrayed as a femme fatale, she became the subject of several fictional works in German and English, especially during the 19th century. Johann Wolfgang von Goethe's brother-in-law, Christian August Vulpius, in 1812 included Sidonia in his  book Pantheon berühmter und merkwürdiger Frauen (Pantheon of Famous and Noteworthy Women). A Gothic romance, Sidonia von Bork, die Klosterhexe, was written in 1847–1848 by Wilhelm Meinhold, a Pomeranian priest  and author. It was published in three volumes in 1848.

An English translation of this novel, titled Sidonia the Sorceress, was published in 1849 by Oscar Wilde's mother, Jane Wilde (later known as Lady Wilde). This translation was also published by William Morris in his Kelmscott Press in 1894.

The English translations achieved a popularity in Great Britain that was unmatched by any other German book in British literary history. Especially in the Pre-Raphaelite Brotherhood, whose members included William  Morris, Dante Gabriel Rossetti, and Edward Burne-Jones, enthusiasm for Sidonia as a Medusa-type femme fatale was widespread. Rossetti is said to have referred to and quoted from the novel "incessantly". Several members created paintings based on the novel, the most famous being Sidonia Von Bork and Clara Von Bork by Burne-Jones in 1860. For his Sidonia painting, Rossetti's mistress Fanny Cornforth served as the model.

Other authors who wrote novels based Sidonia's life were Albert Emil Brachvogel (1824–1878) and Paul Jaromar Wendt (1840–1919). Theodor Fontane (1819-1898) had prepared a novel, Sidonie von Borcke, since 1879. However, he did not finish it. The fragments of it were published in 1966.

See also
Pomerania
Wilhelm Meinhold
Witch-hunt

References

Notes

Bibliography

External links

 An article in Journal von und für Deutschland, 1786.
Wilhelm Meinhold: Sidonia von Bork die Klosterhexe (1847-48)(downloadable, illustrated, complete transcription of the original German text)
English translations of Wilhelm Meinhold's Sidonia the Sorceress at Internet Archive, Google Books, and Project Gutenberg

1548 births
1620 deaths
People from the Duchy of Pomerania
People executed for witchcraft
Executed German people
16th-century German people
17th-century German people
16th-century German women
17th-century German women
People executed by decapitation
17th-century executions in the Holy Roman Empire